Balakənd is a village and municipality in the Sabirabad Rayon of Azerbaijan. It has a population of 694.

Balakənd kəndi. Azərbaycanın ən gözəl kəndi. (Fərman)

References

Populated places in Sabirabad District